María del Rosario Piedra Ibarra (born 14 July 1951) is a Mexican psychologist, activist, and bureaucrat. Since 16 November 2019, she is the president of Mexico's National Human Rights Commission.

Personal life 
Rosario Ibarra Piedra's parents were Jesús Piedra Rosales and Rosario Ibarra, a well known long-time human rights activist, deputy, and senator. She graduated with a Bachelor's degree in psychology from the Autonomous University of Nuevo León in 1985. Since 2004, she also holds a Master's degree in psychopedagogy from the Educational Sciences School (Escuela de Ciencias de la Educación, in Spanish).

Political career 
In 2018, she was the candidate of the National Regeneration Movement (Morena) to deputy of the X federal district in Nuevo León, but failed to get elected. Piedra Ibarra also served as the Secretary of Human Rights within Morena's national executive committee.

On November 16, 2019, she was sworn in as the president of the National Human Rights Commission.

See also 
 National Human Rights Commission
 Human rights in Mexico

References 

1951 births
Living people
Presidents of the National Human Rights Commission (Mexico)
People from Monterrey